Paracles argentina is a moth of the subfamily Arctiinae first described by Carlos Berg in 1877. It is found in Corrientes Province, Argentina.

Taxonomy
The species was treated as a synonym of Paracles laboulbeni by George Hampson in 1901. Research in 2014 concluded it is a valid species.

References

A
Moths of South America
Endemic fauna of Argentina
Moths described in 1877